Thames is a town at the southwestern end of the Coromandel Peninsula in New Zealand's North Island. It is located on the Firth of Thames close to the mouth of the Waihou River. The town is the seat of the Thames-Coromandel District Council. The Māori iwi are Ngāti Maru, who are descendants of Marutuahu's son Te Ngako. Ngāti Maru is part of the Ngati Marutuahu confederation of tribes or better known as Hauraki Iwi.

Thames had an estimated population of 15,000 in 1870, but this declined to 4,500 in 1881, and it has increased modestly since. It is still the biggest town on the Coromandel. Until 2016, a historical oak tree that was planted by Governor George Grey stood on the corner of Grey and Rolleston streets.

Demographics

Thames had a population of 7,293 at the 2018 New Zealand census, an increase of 342 people (4.9%) since the 2013 census, and an increase of 363 people (5.2%) since the 2006 census. There were 3,045 households, comprising 3,420 males and 3,870 females, giving a sex ratio of 0.88 males per female, with 1,149 people (15.8%) aged under 15 years, 930 (12.8%) aged 15 to 29, 2,886 (39.6%) aged 30 to 64, and 2,337 (32.0%) aged 65 or older.

Ethnicities were 82.2% European/Pākehā, 22.1% Māori, 2.7% Pacific peoples, 6.3% Asian, and 1.8% other ethnicities. People may identify with more than one ethnicity.

The percentage of people born overseas was 16.7, compared with 27.1% nationally.

Although some people chose not to answer the census's question about religious affiliation, 47.9% had no religion, 38.1% were Christian, 1.2% had Māori religious beliefs, 1.0% were Hindu, 0.2% were Muslim, 1.5% were Buddhist and 2.4% had other religions.

Of those at least 15 years old, 825 (13.4%) people had a bachelor's or higher degree, and 1,644 (26.8%) people had no formal qualifications. 555 people (9.0%) earned over $70,000 compared to 17.2% nationally. The employment status of those at least 15 was that 2,175 (35.4%) people were employed full-time, 873 (14.2%) were part-time, and 180 (2.9%) were unemployed.

History and culture

Māori history 

In the early 19th century the area was populated by Ngāti Maru and other members of the Marutūāhu collective. Ngāti Maru built a large fortified pā between the Kauaeranga River and Waihou River, known as Te Tōtara. In December 1821, this pā was attacked by a Te Tai Tokerau Māori taua (war party) during the Musket Wars. After a frontal assault was unsuccessful, the taua took the pā by stealth.

European settlement 
Thames was formed from two historic towns, Grahamstown and Shortland, of which many original buildings still stand. Shortland was to the south of Thames and was founded on 27 July 1867 when James Mackay, civil commissioner for the Hauraki District, concluded an agreement with local Māori. The land was rented for mining purposes for the sum of £5,000 per year, a colossal sum in the mid 19th century. This agreement secured the rights to local mineral deposits leading to the proclamation of the Thames Goldfield on 1 August. The leasing of the land for such a huge income was a source of great envy by other Maori iwi and hapu.

Grahamstown was founded the following year at the northern end of present Thames, approximately one mile from Shortland. The two towns merged in 1874 after it emerged the heart of the Goldfield was in Grahamstown. Shortland waned in importance until the turn of the century when the Hauraki Plains were developed for farming and the Shortland railway station was opened.

Gold rush 
The town was initially built during a gold rush, with the first major discovery of gold being made on 10 August 1867 by William Hunt, in the Kuranui Stream at the north end of Thames. The subsequent mine produced more than 102,353oz bullion and was known as the Shotover. The era from 1868 to 1871 were the bonanza years for the town with gold production topping one million pounds sterling at its peak. Official figures for production of the Thames Mines recorded a yield of 2,327,619oz bullion with the value at $845 million. The three richest fields were the Manukau / Golden Crown / Caledonian mines but many others yielded near equivalent amounts. Thames had an estimated population of 15,000 in 1870 which would make it one of the largest cities in New Zealand at the time, but the population had declined to 11,950 (not including Māori) in the 1871 census. The Māori population was 1,428 in 1859. After the gold began to diminish, so did Thames' population, dropping to 5,420 in 1878 and 4,563 in 1881. Thames also benefited from a period of extensive Kauri logging in the surrounding ranges around the same time.

The land involved in goldmining in Thames was Māori-owned; important parts of the goldfield were owned by the Ngāti Maru rangatira (chief) Rapana Maunganoa and the Taipari family. In 1878, when Wiremu Hōterene Taipari married a woman of the Ngāti Awa tribe of Whakatāne, Ngāti Awa carvers arrived at Thames and built a meeting house at Pārāwai. It is incorrectly said to have been a wedding gift for the couple when actually Wiremu's father had paid money for another whare (meeting house), which was sold to the governor general at the time. When Wiremu's father returned to collect the whare the Ngati Awa chief apologised and said he would have another one built which would signify the marriage between Wiremu Taipari and his daughter. The house, named Hotunui in honour of an important Ngāti Maru ancestor, now stands in the Auckland War Memorial Museum.

Recent history 
The Carters - Kopu sawmill, 9 km south of Thames, closed in 2008 with the loss of 145 jobs. In 2012, mayor of Thames-Coromandel called NZTA safety procedures into question when a sink hole on State Highway 25 north of Thames, opened above an old mine shaft.

Marae

The Matai Whetū Marae is located in Kopu. It is a meeting ground for Ngāti Maru and features Te Rama o Hauraki meeting house.

Treasury
Operating since 2009, The Treasury is an archive and research centre located in the town. The book True Tales of Thames was launched at The Treasury by The Coromandel Heritage Trust.

Steampunk 

Steampunk has been a community-supported festival in Thames since 2015.

Local government

The area was initially controlled by the Auckland Provincial Council. In late 1871, a public meeting in Grahamstown resolved:

That in the opinion of the meeting it is desirable that a Municipal Corporation should be established for the Thames.

This resulted in the forming of a Thames Municipality Committee in early 1872. The Borough of Thames was gazetted in November 1873. The first Borough Council was elected in March 1874. As was practice at the time, the councillors voted one from their midst to be the mayor. William Davies was the only person proposed and voted into the role unanimously in April 1874.

During the 1870s, Governor George Grey represented Thames in the New Zealand Parliament.

In total, there were 24 Mayors of Thames Borough. In 1975, Thames Borough amalgamated with Coromandel County, out of which Thames-Coromandel District arose. Hence, the role was succeeded by that of the Mayor of Thames-Coromandel.

Economy

Thames Hospital is the oldest still operating in New Zealand, having been built in the 1860s. The Māori owned land was donated by the Ngāti Maru rangatira Rapana Maunganoa. A new clinical centre and other improvements were completed in 2008, and a new maternity facility opened on 5 September 2011. The Thames Jockey Club was one of the earliest to be established in New Zealand.

The Thames Aerodrome is 3 km south of the town. Regular flights to Auckland are operated by Great Barrier Airlines. A major employer is the Toyota New Zealand plant, which assembled CKD cars until 1998, and now refurbishes imported used cars. Another is the precision engineering works and foundry of A & G Price, established 1868, who built 123 steam locomotives for New Zealand Railways Department. The Brian Boru Hotel, built in 1868, is the oldest Irish pub in New Zealand. Goldfields Shopping Centre is a major shopping mall in Thames. Many residents work in tourism and locally owned businesses servicing the local farming community. Thames has also been used as a filming location for movies including Falling Inn Love and Bridge to Terabithia.

Retail

Most shops are located on Pollen Street.

The Goldfields Shopping Centre, located east of Pollen Street on the western side of the town centre, features about 15 shops including Pak'nSave, The Warehouse and Warehouse Stationery.

Transport

Port 
Initially the main access to Thames was by sea, with goods and passengers landed on the beach. Shortland Wharf was built in 1868 and remains in use. Thames Harbour Board controlled the port from 1876 until it was merged with the Town Council in 1936. By then competition, following the opening of the railway in 1898 and then the Hauraki (now Kopu) Bridge in 1928, had reduced the profitability of the wharves and a commissioner had been appointed, as the town couldn't meet its debts.

Ships which have served Thames have included SS Go Ahead and Northern Steamship Co's Terranora (1898), Kapui (1911) and Waipu (1928).

Railway 
The Thames branch railway connecting the town with Hamilton was opened in 1898 and was closed in 1991 and the tracks were taken up, though Thames railway station remains. The branch now provides part of the course for the Hauraki Rail Trail.

Road 
Thames is on SH25.

Bus 
Thames Connector buses run 5 times a day between Tararu and Parawai. Go Kiwi operate a shuttle bus from the east coast of Coromandel, via Thames, to Auckland. InterCity run twice a day between Auckland and Tauranga via Thames.

Education
The school was established in 1880 and is the second oldest secondary school in the Auckland Province.

It is a state integrated Catholic school.

All these schools are coeducational. Rolls are as of 

A former local institution of learning was the Thames School of Mines.

Another former school, Thames North, was at Tararu. It is now Thames Art Gallery.

Notable people from Thames
 
 
 Kylie Bax – model and actress
 Frances Haselden – headmistress of Kauaeranga Girls' School in Thames
 Thomas Alexander O'Brien – cinema owner and entrepreneur
 Sir Graham Liggins - medical/obstetrical researcher
 Air Chief Marshal Sir Keith Park – WW2 Air Commander and AOC 11 Group during Battle of Britain (July – October 1940)
 Sonny Parker – Welsh international rugby union player
 Bruce Purchase – British actor
 Lloyd Stephenson – hockey player
 Eruini Heina Taipari –  tribal leader

References

External links

Thames Information

1871-74 tram route

Populated places in Waikato
Thames-Coromandel District
Populated places around the Firth of Thames